Santiago Alba Rico (born 1960) is a Spanish writer and philosopher. He has lived in Tunisia for much of the 21st-century. He is known for essays such as Las reglas del caos, Leer con niños or Capitalismo y nihilismo.

Biography 
Santiago Alba Rico was born in Madrid in 1960, the son of journalist, producer, and screenwriter Lolo Rico, who was also the mother of writer . He is also the great-grandson of  politician Santiago Alba Bonifaz and the uncle of Nagua Alba.

Alba earned a licentiate degree in philosophy from the Complutense University of Madrid. He joined the crew of TVE's children show La bola de cristal (created by his mother) as a screenwriter (1984–1988), introducing content under a Marxist point of view. He relocated to Cairo in 1991 and then to Tunisia in 1998. He has worked as a translator to Spanish from Arabic. He was opposed to the rule of Muammar Gaddafi and Bashar Al-Assad in the context of the Libyan and Syrian conflicts.

Podemos presented Alba as their candidate for the Senate in the constituency of the province of Ávila (he owns a residence in Piedralaves) vis-à-vis the December 2015 general election, failing to win the seat.

Works 

Author
 
 
 
 
 
 
 
 
 
 
 
Co-author

References

External links 
 Santiago Alba Rico on Dialnet

1960 births
Living people
Spanish essayists
Spanish philosophers